Špeharji is a small settlement on the left bank of the Kolpa River in the Municipality of Črnomelj in the White Carniola area of southeastern Slovenia. The area is part of the traditional region of Lower Carniola and is now included in the Southeast Slovenia Statistical Region.

The small church in the settlement is dedicated to the Holy Trinity and belongs to the Parish of Sinji Vrh. It dates to the 17th century.

References

External links
Špeharji on Geopedia

Populated places in the Municipality of Črnomelj